Unspeakable is a 2004 album by American jazz guitarist Bill Frisell, his 22nd album overall and his 17th to be released on the Elektra Nonesuch label.

Background
After several albums emphasizing country, folk and blues music, Unspeakable represented a stylistic shift by exploring R&B/funk rhythm and extensive sampling from obscure vinyl records. The album features performances by Frisell, Hal Willner on sampler and turntables, bassist Tony Scherr, drummer Kenny Wollesen, and percussionist Don Alias. Scherr plays second guitar on one song, and on another the band is joined by keyboardist Adam Dorn. Several songs feature a horn section (Steven Bernstein,  Briggan Krauss, and Curtis Fowlkes) and/or a small string section (Jenny Scheinman, Eyvind Kang, and Hank Roberts).

Awards
Unspeakable won the Grammy Award for Best Contemporary Jazz Album in 2005.

Reception
The Allmusic review by Sean Westergaard awarded the album 4.5 stars, stating, "It's all quite accessible, but fans with delicate ears may be put off by some of the noisier moments on the album, like the keyboard sound on "Stringbean" or the guitar solo on "Old Sugar Bear." Other fans will be delighted to hear such a glorious din on a Bill Frisell record again. After so much of a similar thing, it's just great to hear Frisell being pushed in a new direction (and quite a fun one, at that). Recommended. ".

Track listing
All compositions by Bill Frisell except as indicated.

 "1968" – 4:35  
 "White Fang" (Frisell, Willner) – 5:39  
 "Sundust" (Willner) – 2:36
 "Del Close" (Frisell, Eric Liljestrand, Willner) – 5:03  
 "Gregory C." (Frisell, Willner) – 5:38  
 "Stringbean" (Frisell, Liljestrand, Willner) – 5:57  
 "Hymn for Ginsberg" – 2:24  
 "Alias" (Frisell, Liljestrand, Willner) – 7:56  
 "Who Was That Girl?" – 4:50  
 "D. Sharpe" – 4:10  
 "Fields of Alfalfa" (Frisell, Bernstein, Liljestrand, Walter, Willner) – 3:38  
 "Tony" (Frisell, Scherr, Wollesen) – 3:37  
 "Old Sugar Bear" (G.A. Grant, Liljestrand, Willner) –  7:10  
 "Goodbye Goodbye Goodbye" (Frisell, Teddy Lasry, Willner) – 8:58

Personnel
Bill Frisell – guitars
Hal Willner – turntables, samples
Tony Scherr – bass, guitar
Kenny Wollesen – drums
Don Alias – percussion
Steven Bernstein – trumpet
Briggan Krauss – baritone sax
Curtis Fowlkes – trombone
Adam Dorn – synth
Jenny Scheinman – violin
Eyvind Kang – viola
Hank Roberts – cello

References 

2004 albums
Bill Frisell albums
Albums produced by Hal Willner
Nonesuch Records albums
Grammy Award for Best Contemporary Jazz Album